Mark R. Thompson (born June 8, 1960) is an expert on Southeast Asian politics, with particular interest in the Philippines, Thailand, and Indonesia. He also works on broader themes of comparative politics, particularly authoritarianism and democratization. He is professor of politics at the City University of Hong Kong, where he is head of the Department of Asian and International Studies (AIS) and also director of the Southeast Asia Research Centre (SEARC). Earlier he taught in the United Kingdom (Glasgow), Germany (Muenster, Dresden, Passau and Erlangen-Nuremberg), and Japan (Keio University). In 2013-2014 he was president of the Asian Political and International Studies Association (APISA). He has been a regularly commentator on Southeast Asian politics in the international media.

Education
Thompson grew up in the suburbs of Chicago. He completed his B.A. in religious studies from Brown University in 1982 where he also received a Baker scholarship to do postgraduate work at Cambridge University (MA in Social and Political Sciences, 1984). He received an M.A. and Ph.D. (1991 with honors) in political science at Yale University where he was supervised by Juan J. Linz and James C. Scott. Earlier he had received a Dorot foundation fellowship to attend a summer programme at Hebrew University (1980) and a Rotary Foundation scholarship to enroll in the political science MA programme at the University of the Philippines, Diliman (1984–85). In 1983 he studied German at the Goethe Institut, Boppard and in 1988 he studied Tagalog (Filipino) with a Foreign Language and Area Studies Fellowship at the University of Hawaii, Manoa.

Academic career

He taught in various universities in Germany for nearly two decades, including as a lecturer at the University of Münster (1990-1991), as an academic assistant the Federal Army University (Bundeswehr Universität), 1992) in Munich and at the Dresden University of Technology (Technische Universität Dresden), 1993-1995), as acting chair professor and director of the Southeast Asia programme at the University of Passau (2003-2004) and as professor of politics at the Friedrich-Alexander-University Erlangen-Nuremberg beginning in 1997 and again after 2004. He taught in the politics department at the University of Glasgow in Scotland from 1995 to 1997. He is currently teaching at City University of Hong Kong in Hong Kong, China. He has been a visitor at various universities around the world including Thammasat and Chulalongkorn universities in Thailand, De la Salle and Ateneo de Manila University in the Philippines, The University of California, Berkeley, The University for Peace, Costa Rica and Keio University, Japan (the latter two as invited visiting professor). He was Lee Kong Chian distinguished visiting fellow for Southeast Asian Studies at the National University of Singapore in autumn 2008 and, in spring 2009, at Stanford University.

Academic work
Thompson started his career as specialist on the Philippines where he spent three years in the second half of the 1980s doing field research on the opposition to Marcos which he published as The Anti-Marcos Struggle (1995). He has continued to write frequently on Philippine politics and is currently working on a book project about the Philippine presidency with Julio C Teehankee, Dean of the College of Liberal Arts, De la Salle University with whom he recently received a major Hong Kong government GRF grant to study the rise of illiberal rule in the Philippines. Thompson delivered a keynote speech at the Philippine Political Science Association (PPSA) Annual Conference, 10–11 April 2014 later published as “Southeast Asia’s Subversive Voters: A Philippine Perspective,” published in Philippine Studies (2016).

He also works on politics in various Southeast Asia countries in comparative perspective. Together with William C Case he was awarded a major General Research Fund Hong Kong government grant ‘Democracy and its Discontents in Southeast Asia’ in July 2013.

Together with Stephan Ortmann, he is also completing a project funded through a Strategic Research Grant (SRG) of the City University of Hong Kong about China's interest in the “Singapore Model." He has also written on the ‘Asian values’/’Asian democracy’ debate and is currently finishing a book project on ‘authoritarian modernism’ in East Asia.

In the 1990s he published a series of articles on Eastern Europe, former East Germany in particular, as part of his comparative interest in ‘democratic revolutions’, with a book with this title published by Routledge in 2004.

He completed a major German Research Foundation (DFG) project about dynastic female leaders in Asia in which he co-edited a volume published in German (2004) and in English (2013) and has continued to write about issues related to dynastic and female leadership (with the latter research area also involving an article written shortly after Angela Merkel became Chancellor of Germany).

Selected bibliography
Books
 The Anti-Marcos Struggle. Personalistic Rule and Democratic Transition in the Philippines, New Haven: Yale University Press, 1995, .
 Democratic Revolutions: Asia and Eastern Europe, London: Routledge, 2004, .
 (co-edited with Claudia Derichs) Frauen an der Macht. Dynastien und politische Führerinnen in Asien, Passau: Univ. Passau, 2005, .
 (co-edited with Claudia Derichs) Dynasties and Female Political Leaders in Asia: Gender, Power and Pedigree, Berlin/London: LIT Verlag, 2013. .
 (co-edited with Verena Bleichinger and Christina Frantz) Politik in Japan: System, Reformprozesse und Aussenpolitik in internationaler Vergleich (Politics in Japan: System, Reform Processes and Foreign Policy in International Comparative Perspective) (Frankfurt am Main: Campus, 2006), .

Articles
 "Introduction. The Early Duterte Presidency in the Philippines," pp. 3–14 and "Bloodied Democracy: Duterte and the Death of Liberal Reformism in the Philippines," pp. 39–68 both in the Journal of Current Southeast Asian Affairs, 35, no. 3 (2016) (open access, available online).
 “The Vote in the Philippines: Electing a Strongman,” Journal of Democracy, 27:4 (October 2016), pp. 124–134, with Julio Teekankee. 
 “Populism and the Moral Economy of Electoralism in the Philippines and Thailand,” Journal of Developing Societies, 32: 3 (2016): pp. 246–269. 
 “China’s ‘Singapore Model’ and its Limits,” Journal of Democracy, 27, no. 1 (January 2016), pp. 39-48, with Stephan Ortmann.
 “Democracy with Asian Characteristics,” Journal of Asian Studies, vol. 74, no. 4 (November 2015), pp. 875–887.
 “The Politics Philippine Presidents Make: Presidential Style, Patronage-based or Regime Relational?” Critical Asian Studies (September 2014), pp. 433–460.
 (with Stephan Ortmann), “China's Obsession with Singapore: Learning Authoritarian Modernity,”  Pacific Review, 27, issue 3, (May 2014), pp. 433–55.
 “Populism and the Revival of Reform: Competing Narratives in the Philippines,” Contemporary Southeast Asia, 31, no. 1 (2010), pp. 1–28.
 “Japan’s German Path and Pacific Asia’s Flying Geese,” Asian Journal of Social Science, 38, no. 5 (2010), pp. 697–715.
 (with Philipp Kuntz) “More than the Final Straw: Stolen Elections as Revolutionary Triggers,” Comparative Politics, 41, no. 3 (April 2009), pp. 253–272.) (Munich: Allitera, 2007).
 “Asia’s Hybrid Dynasties,” Asian Affairs, XLIII, no. II, July 2012, pp. 204–220.
 “Das Ueberleben des Totalitaritarismus und Developmentalism in Ostasien” (The Survival of Totalitarianism and Developmentalism in East Asia), WeltTrends: Zeitschrift für Internationale Politik, Nr 82 (1/2012).
 “Reformism v. Populism in the Philippines,” Journal of Democracy 21, no. 4 (October 2010), pp. 154–168.
 “Japan’s German Path and Asia’s Flying Geese Formation,” Asian Journal of Social Science , 28, no. 5 (2010), pp. 697–715.
 with Philipp Kuntz, “More than the Final Straw: Stolen Elections as Revolutionary Triggers,” Comparative Politics, 41, no. 3 (April 2009), pp. 253–272.
 “People Power Sours: Uncivil Society in Thailand and the Philippines,” Current History 107, issue 712 (November 2008), pp. 381–387.
 “Presidentas and People Power in Comparative Asian Perspective,” Philippine Political Science Journal, 28, no. 51 (2007), pp. 1–32.
 with Ludmilla Lennartz, “The Making of Chancellor Merkel,” German Politics 15, no. 1 (2006), pp. 99–110.
 with Philipp Kuntz, "Stolen Elections: The Case of the Serbian October," Journal of Democracy, 15, No. 4 (October 2004), pp. 159–172.
 “Pacific Asia after ‘Asian Values’: Authoritarianism, Democracy, and ‘Good Governance’,” Third World Quarterly, 25, no. 6 (2004), pp. 1079-1095.
 “Les présidentes Philippines: essai de comparaison asiatique” Peninsule (special edition: “Les Structures Politiques Traditionnelles a Lépreuve de la Democratie en asie du sud-est’) 48, 1 (2004), pp. 65–84.
 “Female Leadership of Democratic Transitions in Asia,” Pacific Affairs, 75, no. 4 (Winter 2002-2003), pp. 535–555.
 “To Shoot or not to Shoot: Post-Totalitarianism in China and Eastern Europe,” Comparative Politics, Vol. 31, No. 1 (October 2001), pp. 63–83.
 “Whatever Happened to 'Asian Values'?” Journal of Democracy, 12, no. 4 (October 2001), pp. 154–165.
 “Late Industrialisers, Late Democratisers: Developmental States in the Asia-Pacific,” Third World Quarterly, Vol. 17, No. 4 (December 1996), pp. 625–647.
 "Why and How East Germans Rebelled,” Theory and Society, vol. 25, no. 2 (April 1996), pp. 263–299.

References

1960 births
Living people
Scientists from Chicago
American political scientists
Brown University alumni
Yale University alumni
Alumni of the University of Cambridge